Jack Lillard Coleman (May 23, 1924 – December 11, 1998) was an American professional basketball player. After playing college basketball for Louisville, Coleman played in the National Basketball Association for the Rochester Royals and St. Louis Hawks from 1949 through 1957.

Career
A  forward and center from the University of Louisville, Coleman played nine seasons (1949–1958) in the National Basketball Association as a member of the Rochester Royals and St. Louis Hawks. He tallied 6,721 points and 5,186 rebounds in his career, and he represented Rochester in the 1955 NBA All-Star Game. Coleman also appeared in three NBA Finals, winning championships with Rochester in 1951 and St. Louis in 1958.

During the Hawks' losing effort in the 1957 NBA Finals, Coleman became the unwitting victim of one of Bill Russell's greatest defensive plays.  In the final game of the series, Coleman had an opportunity to clinch the Hawks' championship with a layup after receiving an outlet pass at midcourt.  Bill Russell, who had been standing at his own baseline when the play began, ran the entire length of the floor and managed to block Coleman's shot, preserving the victory for the Celtics.  Celtics announcer Johnny Most screamed, "Blocked by Russell! Blocked by Russell! He came from nowhere!"  The play has since gone down in history as the "Coleman Play."

Personal life

Coleman's son, also named Jack, served in the Kentucky House of Representatives in the 55th district from 1991 through 2004. His granddaughter Jacqueline is the current Lieutenant Governor of Kentucky.

NBA career statistics

Regular season

Playoffs

Notes

1924 births
1998 deaths
Basketball players from Kentucky
Centers (basketball)
Indianapolis Jets draft picks
Louisville Cardinals men's basketball players
National Basketball Association All-Stars
People from Mercer County, Kentucky
Power forwards (basketball)
Providence Steamrollers draft picks
Rochester Royals draft picks
Rochester Royals players
St. Louis Hawks players
American men's basketball players